Dublin High School may refer to:

United States
Dublin High School (California), in Dublin
Dublin High School (Georgia), in Dublin
Dublin Coffman High School, in Dublin, Ohio
Dublin Jerome High School, in Dublin, Ohio
Dublin Scioto High School, in Dublin, Ohio
Dublin School, in Dublin, New Hampshire
Dublin High School (Texas), in Dublin
Dublin High School, a former school in Virginia, consolidated into Pulaski County High School in 1974

Other uses
The High School, Dublin in Ireland

See also
Upper Dublin High School, in Fort Washington, Pennsylvania